Anthony James Joseph St Ledger (18 February 1859 – 17 April 1929) was an English-born Australian politician. Born in Barnsley, England, he migrated to Australia as a child and was educated at St Killan College in Ipswich, Queensland. He became a teacher with the Queensland Education Department, but studied law, eventually becoming a barrister. In 1906, he was elected to the Australian Senate as an Anti-Socialist Senator for Queensland, joining the Commonwealth Liberal Party when the Anti-Socialists were absorbed in 1909. His book "Australian Socialism: An Historical Sketch of its Origins and Developments" was published in 1909. He remained in the Senate until his defeat in 1913. Leaving politics, he moved to Melbourne to continue his career in law.

St Ledger died in 1929, aged 70.

References

1859 births
1929 deaths
Free Trade Party members of the Parliament of Australia
Commonwealth Liberal Party members of the Parliament of Australia
Members of the Australian Senate for Queensland
Members of the Australian Senate
20th-century Australian politicians
English emigrants to colonial Australia
 A New Britannia: An Argument Concerning the Social Origins of Australian Radicalism and Nationalism (1970) Humphrey McQueen, Pelican Books Ltd.